Pilz is a German occupational surname, which means a gatherer of mushrooms.

Pilz may also refer to:

 Pilz (company), a German automation technology company
 Pilz (record label), a German record label
 Pilz Glacier, Washington, US

See also
 Pils (disambiguation)